John Harold Mostyn (1887 – 9 July 1956) was the 55th Lord Mayor of Sydney and a rugby league administrator.

Early life and background
Jack Mostyn was born at Orange, New South Wales in 1887 and was an electrician by trade.

Political career
Mostyn was elected as an Alderman of the City of Sydney for Camperdown Ward for the Australian Labor Party in 1924. In 1927 he became Lord Mayor of Sydney. He left office in early 1928, with the dismissal of the City of Sydney and its replacement by a board of commissioners.

NSW Rugby League
Mostyn became the president of the St George District Rugby League Football Club in 1938 and stayed in that role for eight years until 1944, when he lost a ballot for re-election. He was president during the club's first premiership win in 1941. Mostyn was also the St. George Dragons delegate to the NSWRFL for many years.

Later life
A long time resident of Carlton, New South Wales, Jack Mostyn died on 9 July 1956, age 69.  He was later buried at Woronora Cemetery, Sutherland, New South Wales.

References

Mayors and Lord Mayors of Sydney
Sydney City Councillors
Australian trade unionists
Australian Labor Party mayors
Australian rugby league administrators
1887 births
1956 deaths
20th-century Australian politicians
Burials at Woronora Memorial Park